Mohamed Belaid (1873 – 1945), widely known as Rays Lhaj Belaid, was a Moroccan singer-poet (ṛṛays) and rebab player. He sang in Tachelhit. He is considered to be one of the first essential figures of rways (plural of rays), poetry and rebab players in the musical tradition of Shilha people (also known as chleuh).

Biography 
Lhaj Belaid was born around 1873 in a small village near Ouijjane, but he lived most of his life travelling in the region of Souss. His father died when he was child and student in the local madrasa. He quit study and started to work as a shepherd in his village.

Lhaj Belaid started playing flute when he was a shepherd. He continued singing and playing with his rebab until he left for the Sufi town of Tazerwalt to learn more about poetry. Later, he joined a musical group where he played rebab and became increasing popular.

In 1937, he was one of the first Moroccan artists to be invited to record his music for the French Pathé-Marconi in Paris.

Legacy 
Lhaj Belaid was a prolific poet and singer treating several social, cultural and political topics. Some of his famous poems and songs are:

 Mqqar tlla tuga / Taliwin
Aṭbib (the doctor)
 Lḥassani
 Ljuhr (the jewelry)
Ṣṣbeṛ (Patience)
Lhna (Peace)
Lmakina (the Machine)
Lḥijj (the pilgrimage)
Iɣ istara uḍar inu
 Atbir umlil (the white bird)
 Isa ukan txmmamɣ

Death 
In the early 1940s, Lhaj Belaid suddenly disappeared from the musical scene and is believed to have died between 1943 and 1948 (most likely 1945) in a small village in the region of Souss.

See also 

 Omar Wahrouch
 Said Achtouk
 Fatima Tabaamrant

References 

1873 births
1945 deaths
19th-century Moroccan poets
19th-century Moroccan singers
20th-century Moroccan poets
20th-century Moroccan male singers
Moroccan songwriters
Berber musicians
Berber poets
Shilha people